Angelica (French: Angélica, Italian: Rosa di sangue) is a 1939 French-Italian adventure film directed by Jean Choux and starring Viviane Romance, Georges Flamant and Guillaume de Sax. It is based on a novel by Pierre Benoît.

It was shot at the Scalera Studios in Rome. The film's sets were designed by the art directors Alfredo Manzi and Pierre Schild.

Cast
 Viviane Romance as Angélica
 Georges Flamant as Dom Manrique Ruiz / Salvador
 Guillaume de Sax as Diaz
 Paul Amiot as Iramundi
 Marcelle Yrven as Yacca
 Geo Bury as Alvarez
 Raymond Galle as Ramirez
 Pierre Labry as L'officier
 Marcel Maupi as Domingo 
 Monique Thibaut as Manuela

References

Bibliography 
 Goble, Alan. The Complete Index to Literary Sources in Film. Walter de Gruyter, 1999.
 Slavin, David Henry . Colonial Cinema and Imperial France, 1919–1939: White Blind Spots, Male Fantasies, Settler Myths. JHU Press, 2001.

External links 
 

1939 films
French drama films
Italian drama films
1939 drama films
1930s French-language films
Films directed by Jean Choux
French black-and-white films
Films based on French novels
Films set in South America
Films shot at Scalera Studios
1930s French films
French-language Italian films